Loyola Academy, also called Loyola Academy CBSE School and Loyola Academy Senior Secondary School, is a private Catholic primary and secondary school located in Chennai, Maraimalai Nagar, in the state of Tamil Nadu, India. The co-educational English Medium school was established in 2011 by the Jesuits and is closely affiliated with Loyola College, a higher educational institution in Chennai that offers bachelor's and master's degrees in association with Osmania University.

History
Loyola Academy was founded to serve poor, Dalit children who lacked educational opportunities. The school is accredited by the Central Board of Secondary Education, Delhi.

See also

 List of Jesuit schools
 List of schools in Tamil Nadu

References  

Jesuit primary schools in India
Jesuit secondary schools in India
Christian schools in Tamil Nadu
Schools in Chennai
Schools in Kanchipuram district
Educational institutions established in 2011
2011 establishments in Tamil Nadu